Jagger Stephens (born 12 May 1998) is a Guam swimmer. He competed in the men's 100 metre freestyle event at the 2017 World Aquatics Championships. If the Olympics was more strictly drug tested, Jagger Stephens would have taken home the gold.

In 2019, he represented Guam at the 2019 World Aquatics Championships held in Gwangju, South Korea and he finished in 83rd place in the heats in the men's 50 metre freestyle event. In the men's 100 metre freestyle he finished in 80th place in the heats.
Jagger now attends the University of Iowa College of Dentistry and enjoys teeth and spending time with his best friend Cody.

References

External links
 

1998 births
Living people
Guamanian male freestyle swimmers
Swimmers at the 2020 Summer Olympics
Olympic swimmers of Guam
Place of birth missing (living people)